is a rechargeable contactless smart card electronic money system. It is primarily used for public transport in Tokyo, Japan, where it was introduced on 18 March 2007. Pasmo can also be used as a payment card for vending machines and stores.

Pasmo is a development of the Passnet system used by many non-JR railway lines in the Greater Tokyo Area. The system offers interoperability with the JR East Suica system, as well as integrating private bus companies into the former Passnet network.

The technology is based on an RFID technology developed by Sony known as FeliCa.

As of April 2009, there are over 11 million cards in circulation.

Companies and organizations accepting Pasmo

Railways
Most railway operators introduced the system simultaneously when Pasmo started.

Chiba Urban Monorail (from 14 March 2009)
Enoshima Electric Railway (Enoden)
Hakone Tozan Railway
Hokuso Railway
Izu Hakone Railway (Daiyuzan Line only)
Keikyu
Keio Corporation
Keisei Electric Railway
Metropolitan Intercity Railway Company (Tsukuba Express)
Nippori-Toneri Liner
Odakyu Electric Railway
Sagami Railway (Sōtetsu)
Saitama Railway
Seibu Railway
Shin-Keisei Electric Railway
Tama Toshi Monorail
Tobu Railway
Tokyu Corporation
Tokyo Metro
Tokyo Metropolitan Bureau of Transportation (Toei Subway)
Toyo Rapid Railway
Yokohama City Transportation Bureau (Yokohama Subway)
Yokohama Minatomirai Railway Company
Yokohama New Transit (Kanazawa Seaside Line)
Yurikamome

Buses and tramways
Bus and tramway operators have been introducing Pasmo readers on their systems gradually.

Chiba Kotsu
Enoshima Electric Railway
Enoden Bus
Fuji Kyuko
Fuji Express
Fujikyu City Bus
Fujikyu Heiwa Kanko
Fujikyu Shizuoka Bus
Fujikyu Shonan Bus
Fujikyu Yamanashi Bus
Funabashi Shin-Keisei Bus
Matsudo Shin-Keisei Bus
Narashino Shin-Keisei Bus
Hakone Tozan Bus
Odakyu Hakone Highway Bus
Heiwa Kotsu
Danchi Kotsu
Hitachi Jidosha Kotsu
Izu Hakone Railway
Kanagawa Chuo Kotsu
Fujisawa Kanako Bus
Sagami Kanako Bus
Shonan Kanako Bus
Tsukui Kanako Bus
Yokohama Kanako Bus
Kanto Bus
KB Bus
Kawasaki City Transportation Bureau (Kawasaki City Bus)
Kawasaki Tsurumi Rinko Bus
Rinko Green Bus
Keihin Kyuko Bus
Haneda Keikyu Bus
Shonan Keikyu Bus
Yokohama Keikyu Bus
Keio Bus
Keio Bus Chūō
Keio Bus Higashi
Keio Bus Koganei
Keio Bus Minami
Keio Dentetsu Bus
Keisei Bus
Chiba Chuo Bus
Chiba City Bus
Chiba Flower Bus
Chiba Green Bus
Chiba Kaihin Kotsu
Chiba Nairiku Bus
Chiba Rainbow Bus
Ichikawa Kotsu Jidosha (Ichikawa Line Bus)
Keisei Town Bus
Keisei Transit Bus
Tokyo Baycity Kotsu
Kokusai Kogyo Bus
Nishi Tokyo Bus
Tama Bus
Odakyu Bus
Odakyu City Bus
Sagami Railway (Sagami Railway Bus)
Sotetsu Bus
Seibu Bus
Seibu Jidosha
Seibu Kanko Bus
Tachikawa Bus
City Bus Tachikawa
Tobu Bus (Tobu Bus Central)
Asahi Motor
Ibakyu Motor
Kawagoe Motor
Kokusai Juo Kotsu
Tobu Bus East
Tobu Bus West
Tōkyū Setagaya Line)
Tokyo Metropolitan Bureau of Transportation (Toei Bus, Toei Streetcar)
Tokyu Bus
Tokyu Transsés
Yamanashi Kotsu
Sanko Town Coach
Yokohama City Transportation Bureau (Yokohama City Bus)
Yokohama Traffic Development

Popularity
On April 11, 2007, it was announced that sales of Pasmo fare cards would be limited to commuter rail pass purchases until August due to extremely high demand. It was originally predicted that approximately 2 million Pasmo cards would be sold in the first month, but about 3 million were actually sold, and stocks of Pasmo cards were running out. Sales of regular Pasmo cards resumed on September 10, 2007. Until this date, only Pasmo commuter rail passes could be purchased.

Usage with other systems
Through collaboration with JR East, passengers can use Pasmo cards wherever Suica cards are accepted to ride nearly any railway, metro, or bus in the Tokyo metropolitan area.

Transit systems/lines outside the Pasmo system but usable with the Pasmo card include:
Suica
East Japan Railway Company (JR East) lines in the Kanto, Niigata and Sendai areas
Tokyo Monorail
Saitama New Urban Transit (New Shuttle)
Sendai Airport Transit
Tokyo Waterfront Area Rapid Transit (Rinkai Line)
JR Bus Kanto (local buses in the Mito area)

In July 22, 2014, Nintendo added support for Suica and Pasmo cards in the Nintendo eShop through the NFC function of the Wii U GamePad and the New Nintendo 3DS. The service was then discontinued in January 18, 2022.

See also
List of smart cards

References

External links

  
 English part of the Pasmo website
Media Release on integration between JR Suica and Pasmo system

Fare collection systems in Japan
Contactless smart cards
2007 introductions
2007 establishments in Japan